The National Tobacco Works Branch Stemmery is a stemmery in Louisville, Kentucky, located at 2410-18 W. Main St.  It was built in 1898 and was listed on the National Register of Historic Places in 1983.

The building was designed by D.X. Murphy & Brothers;  D.X. Murphy also designed the Jefferson County Jail (Louisville, Kentucky) and the Jefferson Branch Library.
 
It was part of Louisville's National Tobacco Works, a large manufacturer of chewing tobacco.

It was later the Hubbuch In Kentucky Service Center.

See also
National Tobacco Works, also NRHP-listed in Louisville
National Tobacco Works Branch Drying House, also NRHP-listed in Louisville

References

Industrial buildings completed in 1898
National Register of Historic Places in Louisville, Kentucky
Stemmeries
Tobacco buildings in the United States
1898 establishments in Kentucky
Industrial buildings and structures on the National Register of Historic Places in Kentucky